The 2012 NASCAR Camping World Truck Series was the eighteenth season of the third highest stock car racing in the United States. The season was contested over twenty-two races, beginning with the NextEra Energy Resources 250 at Daytona International Speedway and ending with the Ford EcoBoost 200 at Homestead-Miami Speedway. NASCAR announced some changes, including the removal of New Hampshire Motor Speedway, Nashville Superspeedway, and Lucas Oil Raceway from the schedule, and moving the Phoenix race back to its traditional fall date. In addition, Rockingham Speedway was added to the schedule, the first time NASCAR has raced at Rockingham since 2004. James Buescher of Turner Motorsports claimed his first championship with a 13th-place finish in the season finale. Chevrolet won the Manufacturer's Championship with 166 points and 12 wins.

Teams and drivers

Complete schedule

Limited schedule

Note: A driver designated with a (R) next to their name indicates that they are contenders for the 2012 Rookie of the Year award.

Team changes
The Kevin Harvick, Inc.-Richard Childress Racing Merger and Related Spinoff

Richard Childress Racing, per agreement in the Kevin Harvick, Inc. merger agreement, acquired the 2011 Owners Champion No. 2 truck as part of the Harvick-Childress merger that also included the No. 2 and No. 33 Nationwide teams.  The No. 8 and No. 33 trucks were spun off in a separate deal.
Harvick spun off the No. 8 and No. 33 Truck teams, which Eddie Sharp Racing, acquired.  The teams in the spinoff join the present No. 6 truck driven by Justin Lofton to form a three-truck team, which resulted in a September 2011 decision to switch manufacturers from Toyota to Chevrolet immediately, with support from Childress.  The spinoff also included development driver Cale Gale, who drove the No. 33 Rheem Chevrolet.

Other Changes
ThorSport Racing switched to Toyota Tundras for the 2012 season, with the three teams of Matt Crafton (#88), Johnny Sauter (#13), and Dakoda Armstrong (#98) running for the full season.

Discontinued operations
Germain Racing had shut down the No. 9 and No. 30 trucks with employees asked to look for other employment, as the team's Sprint Cup team changed to Ford from Toyota.

Driver changes

Changed teams
Neither of the Kevin Harvick, Inc. drivers were retained by Eddie Sharp Racing after the spinoff.  Ron Hornaday Jr. joined Joe Denette Motorsports and drive their No. 9 Chevrolet. He was reunited with KHI crew chief Jeff Hensley.  Hornaday was not an exempt driver through the points standings during the first five races, but had an exemption through his status as a former Series Champion.  (Series champions have an exemption available in certain circumstances.)
Nelson Piquet Jr. moved to Turner Motorsports to contest the full Truck series season as well as a limited Nationwide schedule. Piquet Jr. was teammates with fellow Brazilian Miguel Paludo, who leaves Red Horse Racing.
After enduring a disappointing season at Germain Racing, Brendan Gaughan moves to Richard Childress Racing to run 8 Truck races.  Those races were in the No. 2 truck acquired in the Childress-Harvick merger.
After Germain Racing shut down its Truck Series operations, Todd Bodine moves to Red Horse Racing to driving the No. 11 truck that was the No. 7 that Miguel Paludo drove. However, Bodine tweeted that he needed sponsorship to run the season.
After a disappointing 2011, David Starr took the number 81 with him to the newly formed Arrington Racing formed by engine builder Joey Arrington.
After a one-year stint with Joe Denette Motorsports, Jason White formed his own team for 2012 and fielded Fords.

Rookie entries
The Rookie of the Year standout would be Ty Dillon, the younger brother of 2011 Champion Austin Dillon. Ty scored a win at Atlanta and was in contention for the championship until a late crash at Homestead knocked him to 4th in the points but easily won him the RoTY title. Former Kevin Harvick, Inc. development driver Cale Gale was runner-up to Dillon, taking a pole at Bristol and a win at Homestead. Ross Chastain finished 3rd in the rookie battle, while John Wes Townley, despite missing Daytona, had two top-10s.  Contenders Jeb Burton, Dakoda Armstrong, and Daytona winner John King saw their runs for RoTY aborted due to sponsorship issues. K&N Pro Series East Champion Max Gresham struggled with Joe Denette Motorsports and departed the team early on. Duke University graduate Paulie Harraka struggled most of the season with Wauters Motorsport and left before Atlanta.

Returned to the series
Tim George Jr. returned to the Truck Series for the first time since 2009. He ran 12 races driving Richard Childress Racing's No. 2 truck inherited from Kevin Harvick, Inc.
David Reutimann returns to the series for 4 races with RBR Enterprises.
Ward Burton returned to NASCAR for the first time after a five-year absence, driving the season-opening Daytona race for Hillman Racing. His son Jeb would drive the following 4 races before a lack of sponsorship ended his run.

Exited the series
Truck Series champion and former Rookie of the Year Austin Dillon moved up to the NASCAR Nationwide Series full-time with crew chief Danny Stockman.
Johanna Long moved to the Nationwide Series for a limited schedule with ML Motorsports.
Cole Whitt moved up to the NASCAR Nationwide series full-time in the 88 Chevrolet with JR Motorsports.

2012 calendar

Calendar changes
The Las Vegas race, as a result of issues resulting from the 2011 race weekend, was moved back to late September as a stand-alone race.   Originally, the Las Vegas race was set for 13 October at 12 noon PDT as part of the IndyCar weekend, but Indy Racing League LLC faces issues from the 2011 IZOD IndyCar World Championship which the 2011 Truck race was the Saturday feature of the race meet, but that meet was removed as a result of legal issues following the death of Dan Wheldon on Lap 11 of the IZOD IndyCar Series feature.

Speedway Motorsports also removed races from New Hampshire Motor Speedway, while keeping the second Kentucky truck date and having the NASCAR Nationwide Series replace INDYCAR on the fall weekend. Darlington was also removed from the schedule, both Nashville races, and Lucas Oil Motorsports Park. Chicagoland also moved to July. Kansas moved from June to April, along with the Cup series as their spring date was also moved to April to give more time for Kansas's new configuration project. Rockingham Speedway was added to the truck series schedule marking the first time since 2004 NASCAR has had a race at the track. The total of races on the schedule was also reduced from 25 to 22. Iowa Speedway also got a second date that was held in September.

Results and standings

Races

Drivers' standings

(key) Bold – Pole position awarded by time. Italics – Pole position earned by points standings. * – Most laps led.

1 – Post entry, driver and owner did not score points.
2 – Ryan Blaney was originally registered for Nationwide points, but switched to the Trucks at Atlanta.

Manufacturer

See also
 2012 NASCAR Sprint Cup Series
 2012 NASCAR Nationwide Series
 2012 NASCAR K&N Pro Series East
 2012 ARCA Racing Series
 2012 NASCAR Canadian Tire Series
 2012 NASCAR Toyota Series
 2012 NASCAR Stock V6 Series
 2012 Racecar Euro Series

References

NASCAR Truck Series seasons